Wolfgang Jobst (born 6 October 1956) is an Australian sports shooter. He competed in the men's 10 metre air rifle event at the 1988 Summer Olympics.

References

External links
 

1956 births
Living people
Australian male sport shooters
Olympic shooters of Australia
Shooters at the 1988 Summer Olympics
Place of birth missing (living people)
Commonwealth Games medallists in shooting
Commonwealth Games silver medallists for Australia
Shooters at the 1986 Commonwealth Games
20th-century Australian people
21st-century Australian people
Medallists at the 1986 Commonwealth Games